The Last Kolczaks is a 1920 German silent drama film directed by Alfred Halm and starring Victor Janson, Ellen Richter, and Adele Sandrock.

The film's sets were designed by the art director Jack Winter.

Cast
 Victor Janson as Gutsherr
 Ellen Richter as Tochter des Gutsherrn
 Adele Sandrock as Mutter
 Hermann Vallentin as Verwalter

References

Bibliography
 Hans-Michael Bock & Michael Töteberg. Das Ufa-Buch. Zweitausendeins, 1992.

External links

1920 films
Films of the Weimar Republic
German silent feature films
Films directed by Alfred Halm
German black-and-white films
UFA GmbH films
1920s German films